Nahsukin Mountain is located in the Livingston Range, Glacier National Park in the U.S. state of Montana. Nahsukin Mountain is situated along the Continental Divide. "Nahsukin" is Kootenai for "chief".

See also
 List of mountains and mountain ranges of Glacier National Park (U.S.)

References

Livingston Range
Mountains of Flathead County, Montana
Mountains of Glacier County, Montana
Mountains of Glacier National Park (U.S.)
Mountains of Montana